Nwa is a town and commune in Cameroon.

References

Populated places in Northwest Region (Cameroon)